Anaa, previously titled Kainat, is a 2019 Pakistani Urdu language television romantic drama. Produced by Momina Duraid under the banner MD Productions. It stars Shehzad Sheikh, Hania Aamir, Naimal Khawar and Usman Mukhtar. Aamir also made her singing debut, as she performed the series theme song.

Plot
Daneen is a free-spirited girl who lives with her father Zahid and grandfather Arshad. She is in love with Areesh, a wealthy and handsome young man who is also her second cousin. Areesh lives in Shamsher Nagar with his family and paternal grandmother, Sadia Begum. In addition to raising Areesh, Saadia Begum also raised two distant relatives of Sadia Begum, Altamash, and his younger sister Anya, both of whom were orphaned when they were young children. When the show begins, Altamash is a handsome young man and Areesh's best friend, though he dislikes Daneen. Sadia Begum opposes Daneen and Areesh's union due to some serious family issues that happened 25 years before the events of the show. Saadia Begum's older son Waleed was in love with Nazia, his maternal cousin, and the daughter of Arshad, but Nazia rejected him, causing Waleed to commit suicide. Nazia is Daneen's paternal aunt and was banished from her father's mansion 25 years ago when she chose to marry Waleed's friend Azam. Sadia Begum cannot forget this and strongly opposes Daneen and Areesh's marriage. Now Azam and Nazia live with their only daughter, Izza.

One day, Daneen goes with Areesh to get a tattoo on her right arm. The tattoo is Areesh's name. On the same day, Areesh's family, along with Anya, arrive at Daneen's house. Daneen arrives late, which angers Sadia Begum. Sadia Begum scolds Daneen in front of everyone for being childish and asks her who will marry her if she does not grow up. Daneen replies that Areesh will, which shocks everyone, including Anya (who has feelings for Areesh). Infuriated, Sadia Begum leaves. The next day, she asks Nashwa about Daneen's whereabouts. Hesitant, Nashwa confesses that Daneen was late as she had gone to get a tattoo. Later, Sadia Begum goes with Ghazanfar (Areesh's father) to Daneen's house to tell Zahid (Daneen's father) and her grandfather about Daneen's inappropriate action. Everyone is shocked when they see that Daneen has a tattoo of Areesh's name, implying that she loves him. Sadia Begum then tells Ghazanfar and Mumtaz (Areesh's mother) that a marriage should be arranged between Areesh and Anya, as she believes that Daneen is just following in her aunt's (Nazia's) footsteps. This gives Arshad a heart attack and causes Sadia Begum to finally relent.

Daneen meets Izza at the hospital (without knowing that she is her first cousin), and after talking for an hour in friendly conversation, Izza realizes that Daneen belongs to her mother's family and is her maternal cousin. But Izza does not disclose this to Daneen, and the two maintain their friendship. Daneen invites Izza to her engagement party, where everyone is impressed by Izza's graceful behavior, though no one knows that she is Nazia's daughter. Altamash is suspicious about Izza so he does some digging into her past. He discovers her true identity and later confronts Izza. Izza tells him that her only intention was to know her maternal family. Altamash promises not to reveal her secret.

Daneen's father, Zahid, finds out that Daneen's friend Izza is his niece. He goes to his sister's house and mends the broken ties with her. Soon, Nazia, Azam, and Izza all visit Daneen's grandfather's house, and Daneen's grandfather happily accepts his estranged daughter back to the family. However, Sadia Begum and Ghazanfar discover this and give Daneen two choices: either to marry Areesh and break all ties with her family or to break the engagement with Areesh. Daneen refuses to leave her family, and so breaks off the engagement. Marriage is then arranged between Areesh and Anya, Altamash's younger sister, who had endured a traumatic past. She had been raped when she was just ten years old. Anya wants to tell Areesh about this before their marriage. Meanwhile, Daneen decides to find a man and marry him before Areesh and Anya's marriage to take revenge.

Daneen finally finds a man named Saif, a forty-year-old politician whose wife died seven years ago. Saif never got over the loss. Daneen believes he is the best match for her since she is heartbroken too. They both agree to marry each other, respecting the fact that they are both in love with other people, and will maintain their distance even after getting married. Daneen also shows the tattoo she made on her arm for Areesh to Saif. Meanwhile, Izza is angry at Altamash because she believes he is the one who revealed her secret to Sadia Begum and Ghazanfar. In actuality, Altamash never betrayed her, and he tries his best to clear up this misunderstanding with Izza.

Daneen and Zahid go to Shamsher Nagar to ask Sadia Begum to visit Sher Ghar, as Arshad sorely misses her. However, Ghazanfar throws them out of his house. Sadia Begum, who had broken all ties with her elder brother, is later devastated and guilt-stricken when her brother dies. Daneen insults her since she ruined her brother's last days. Areesh, too, feels guilty since he could not stick to the promise he had made to Daneen's grandfather, which was to always stand by Daneen. However, Areesh now feels that he has no other option than to marry Anya. Meanwhile, Daneen marries Saif.

Izza wants to work, which is strongly opposed by Nazia, as she thinks this will damage Sher Ghar's pride. Nevertheless, Izza finally lands a job interview with the support of her father Azam. However, Altamash takes Izza away from the job interview as he believes the job was not right for Izza. Altamash then offers Izza a position at his office, but she turns him down. Nazia begins to manipulate Daneen to torture Sadia Begum and her family. Daneen is initially hesitant, but Nazia manages to convince her and has Daneen attend Anya and Areesh's wedding in her bridal dress. Her goal is to hurt Areesh by showing him what a gem he has lost. Upon seeing Daneen, Areesh loses control and wants to halt his marriage, but Sadia Begum manages to get the situation under control. Furthermore, Altamash reveals to Anya that Areesh is clueless about Anya's rape story. Daneen later regrets her actions since Anya, an innocent soul, was hurt in the process. Areesh and Anya, now a married couple, have a tense relationship since it is clear that Areesh still loves Daneen and has no place in his heart for Anya. Meanwhile, Anya decides to keep her rape story a secret.

Daneen tries to strengthen her bond with her husband, Saif. Saif is going on a business trip to Murree and decides to take Daneen there too on a 'honeymoon' and Daneen is overjoyed. She sees this trip as an opportunity to make her marriage work but fails because Saif has no interest in Daneen. Furthermore, Daneen has vowed to Anya to make Areesh love her so that the two can live a happy life together. Anya and Areesh grow closer to each other in terms of friendship though Areesh still loves Daneen just the way he used to. Izza and Altamash grow close to each other despite their contradictory personalities and constant arguments. Altamash and Izza meet at a party and text each other making Nazia (who was present there) suspicious about them. Altamash helps Izza in getting a job in a bank. later Nazia asks Altamash to marry her Izza but Izza promptly rejects the idea. Saif turns out to be an abusive husband to Daneen. Also, Areesh's father Ghazanfar pressurizes Anya to get Altamash and Nashwa (Areesh's younger sister) married but Altamash does not agree nor does Nashwa.

Izza's father opposes Nazia's wish and takes Izza and Kabir (Izza's cousin) to their old house but Nazia doesn't come with them. Nazia wants Altamash to marry Izza and reject Nashwa to take revenge from Sadia Begum and Ghazanfer for they were the reason behind Azam paralysis (because they shot him) and they also did not let Nazia rejoin her family. But Izza bluntly refuses (of marrying Altamash) in front of Sadia Begum, Nazia, Nashwa, and Altamash. This causes Altamash to say 'Yes' for Nashwa and he does so. Meanwhile, Daneen is provoked by Areesh to get a divorce from Saif so that he can marry Daneen.

Saif throws a formal party at which Areesh's family, Izza's family, and Altamash were present among others. Daneen again blinded by the love of Areesh sings a poem for Areesh she was singing it for Saif but everyone knows that Daneen is singing it for Areesh. This causes a conflict between Daneen and Saif. Daneen clearly says to Saif that she is in love with Areesh and she wants a divorce from him to marry Areesh. But Saif clearly says to her that he would not divorce her because that may spoil his image. After coming from the party Areesh finds about Anya's pregnancy on hearing this news he is overjoyed and is happy with Anya forgetting once again the promises he made with Daneen. Altamash gives this news to Izza (who has come into his office to discuss investment). On hearing this news from Izza, Daneen calls Areesh on which he says that he will never leave her but Daneen assures him that he has already left her.

Saif has called up Zahid and Nazia (Daneen's father and Aunt) to talk about Daneen's behavior at the party and in their relationship. Izza is present but leaves for a short while to attend a call by Altamash who orders Izza to leave the place as he thinks that her support to Daneen is wrong. Izza refuses and says Daneen is to her what Anya is to Altamash. She returns to the room where Saif is complaining to Zahid who feels ashamed of his daughter's doings. Izza fights for Daneen by asking Saif if he had been fair to Daneen in their relationship Daneen would have not thought of going back to Areesh as Daneen must have tried for their relationship to work while Saif hadn't. Saif asks her to leave and leaves himself too.

Back at home, Zahid agrees with Saif's behavior and declares his boycott to Daneen. Izza tries to reason with her uncle for a divorce but he and Nazia say there have never been and will never be divorced in Sher Ghar. Izza disagrees with their rules and says the people of Sher Ghar would rather banish their relations and support the wrongdoers. She feels Areesh should be punished for he is the one who caused Daneen to go astray. The next morning Izza goes to Areesh to ask him to go to Saif and agree to his wrongdoings to Daneen and that he motivated her to all. Altamash backs up Areesh disagreeing with Izza but Anya assures Izza that Areesh will go and end what he has started. Nashwa remains silent throughout.

Saif gives Daneen punishment by making her do his house chores all day and Daneen still thinks Areesh will come for her rescue. Altamash apologizes for Izza for his behavior and promises to support her indecision of supporting Daneen. Altamash had said yes for Nashwa to help her get admission to art school but she says that she has fallen in love with him to which he replies that he has never loved her nor he will. Altamash also clarifies his position in front of Izza that he only helped Nashwa get into an art school and she is not his fiancé. Furthermore, he also gives Izza information about Daneen's worse condition. After ruining Daneen's life once again, Areesh plans a honeymoon for him and Anya. Nazia goes to meet Daneen and says her to come back to Sher Ghar but she refuses to say that she will only come when Areesh will come to rescue her.

Ghazanfar calls Altamash and threatens him that if he did not marry Nashwa he will send Anya home and take her child away. Nazia contacts Sadia Begum's maid and gives her financial advantages to tell her secrets of Shamsher Nagar. The maid told the secrets of Anya (her past story) and Nashwa (that she was caught with her boyfriend by Daneen and Anya) to Nazia. Nazia sends a message about Anya's secret to Areesh and sends Nashwa's picture (which she took from Daneen's phone when she visited her) to Ghazanfar. Areesh feels betrayed and feels that Anya does not trust her. He goes to meet Nazia who tells him about Daneen's condition as she is being treated harshly by her in-laws. Areesh then decides to live with Daneen not with Anya and goes to Saif's house to take Daneen but Saif and his mother does not allow him to do that but Daneen tricks everyone and silently gets out of the house fooling the guard and quickly sits in Areesh's car. Meanwhile, Saif insults Areesh and tell his father all the situation and tell Areesh to get out. Areesh gets out of the house and angrily sits in the car. After seeing Daneen, he gets shocked and overexcited.

Areesh drove Daneen to the flat (he bought when they both got engaged). Meanwhile, the closeness between Izza and Altamash is getting stronger. Areesh then plans to take Daneen and move out of Pakistan. He shares his plan with his wife, Anya, who seems to support him throughout. However, Anya plays a double game and sides with her in-laws, getting Daneen kidnapped. Daneen apologizes to everyone in Shamsher Nagar and begs them to leave her alone but Ghazanfar called saif. After seeing Saif Daneen jumps from the balcony. she was shifted to ICU, Areesh came to visit her, and fights with Ghazanfar. Meanwhile, Altamash proposed to Izza and tells her that he wants to spend his entire life with her. Even though Izza wanted to say yes to his proposal, she denied and told Altamash that her father had already set her marriage with Kabeer. Altamash assures Izza that this marriage won't take place under any circumstances. Nazia tried to convince Izza to call the wedding off but Izza said that she will respect her father's decision, even though she loves Altamash.

Azam, Izzah's father bears this conversation between his daughter and wife. When Kabeer and Izzah's Nikkah is about to start, Altamash enters and tells everyone that he will always be by Izzah's side and assures that Izza can depend on him. He also says that it is Izzah's right to choose her life partner and no one can force her. Listening to this, Azam tells Izza that if she wants to disagree, she can. Izza then disagrees. Meanwhile, Daneen survives and Anya tells Areesh that she helped Ghazanfar in finding Daneen and that she was part of the plan. Areesh became furious and left. Daneen escaped from the hospital and hid at Izza's house. Nashwa plans to get Anya and Areesh killed and they were shot. Anya gave birth to a son and Areesh was still in ICU. Izza argues with Altamash that he's misunderstanding Daneen.

Izza funds a flash drive in her driveway which said that Altamash killed a guy named Saleem. Altamash later realizes and confronts Daneen that he misunderstood her and apologizes. Daneen convinces Izza to patch things up with Altamash. Altamash apologizes to Izzah, says that he truly loves her and she's the most beautiful person he's ever met. Izza then confronts Altamash and asks him if he killed someone. Altamash feels hurt that Izza doesn't trust him and asks her to leave. Daneen helps the two to patch things up. Altamash visits Daneen at Izzah's house. Daneen tells him to fix things with Izza and to send her abroad. Altamash replies I'm saying that Izza has a huge trust issue and a relationship can not survive if the trust isn't there. Daneen then tells Izza the entire story and the reason why Altamash killed that man. Which was that Manager Saleem raped Anya at a very young age. Daneen also tells Izza that Altamash takes good care of the Manager's wife and kids. Daneen visits Areesh in the hospital and Ghazanfar surprisingly apologizes to Nazia and Daneen that he wronged them a lot and ruined their lives. Meanwhile, Altamash has a hunch that Nashwa is the one who planned to get Areesh and Anya killed. Nashwa disagrees and blames it on Altamash. Then Altamash opens Nashwas phone and shows the messages she sent the guy who shot her brother and pregnant sister in law, to Ghazanfar. Izza was also present there. Later, Izza goes to Altamash and apologizes.

A very hurt Altamash says to Izza that she trusts everyone except for him. And asks Izza to leave. Meanwhile, Areesh recovered from his poor condition. Anya tells Altamash to book her and the baby's tickets as she thinks that Areesh will choose Daneen over her. Izza and Nazia visit Areesh at ShamsherNagar. Altamash is also present there, but Daneen and Zahid are nowhere to be seen. Anya asks Izza where they are and in reply, Areesh says that they're in New York. Then a flashback is played in the episode where Daneen visits Areesh to tell him that she's moving to the states with her father and wants to move on with her life. Areesh tells Anya he wants to be with his whole family but it is visible at his face that he has accepted his fate and Anya but loves Daneen only.Meanwhile, Nazia scolds Altamash that he's very spoilt and should leave her daughter alone. Altamash realizes his mistakes and talks to Izza about it. They start fresh and soon get married. The drama ends with Altamash teasing Izza and then complimenting her. The Shamsher Nagar and Sher Gharh families live happily ever after

Cast
Main Cast:
Hania Aamir as Daneen Saif (née Sher); the heiress of Shergarh, the only child of Zahid Sher and the true love of Areesh though married to Saif
Shehzad Sheikh as Areesh Ghazanfar; the heir of Shamshernagar, only son of Ghazanfar and Mumtaz and the true love of Daneen though married to Anya
Naimal Khawar Abbas as Izza Khan; the only child of Nazia and Azam Khan, love interest of Altamash
Usman Mukhtar as Altamash; the older brother of Anya and Areesh's cousin, love interest of Izza. 

Supporting cast:
Javeria Kamran as Nashwa Ghazanfar; the only daughter of Ghazanfar and Mumtaz.
Tara Mahmood as Nazia Sher; Zahid's younger sister.
Farhan Ali Agha as Azam Khan; Nazia's husband.
Irfan Khoosat as Arshad Sher; the older brother of Sadia.
Seemi Raheel as Sadia Begum; the younger sister of Arshad Sher and mother of Ghazanfar.
Shamil Khan as Ghazanfar; the younger son of Sadia Begum.
Raju Jamil as Zahid Sher; the only son of Arshad Sher and nephew of Sadia Begum.
Areeba Shahood as Anya; the cousin of Areesh and Daneen, Areesh's wife and mother of his kid. 
Muqeet Khan as Kabir; Izza's paternal cousin.
Anusheh Aamir as Beena; Altamash's former girlfriend.
Humayun Khan as Humayun; Guitarist.

Home media and digital release
The show was also released on YouTube alongside its airing on TV. It became available on iflix after syndication and remained available till late 2019. The show is also available on Indian streaming platform MX Player.

Reception 
Each episode of Anaa has more than 3 million views on YouTube and received 5.6 TRPs at its highest. The sparkling chemistry of Izza and Altamash has been applauded by the masses and got huge viewership. At 19th Lux Style Awards, Usman Mukhtar and Naimal Khawar got nomination of Best Emerging Talent for their respective breakthrough performances.

Accolades

Production
The series had been shot in the scenic locations of Chitral. The series was earlier titled Kainaat but was later changed to Anaa. In an earlier interview with DAWN, Hania Amir talked about her character, "This one has a journey very similar to a lot of individuals out there who own their individuality and their uniqueness and in return are not very much liked for just being themselves".

Soundtrack

The title song was sung by Sahir Ali Bagga & Hania Amir. The music was composed by Sahir Ali Bagga and the lyrics were written by Imran Raza.

References

External links
Official website

Pakistani television series
2019 Pakistani television series debuts
2019 Pakistani television series endings
Hum TV original programming
Urdu-language television shows